The Pacific Northwest Junior Lacrosse League, or PNWJLL is a Junior B Tier 2 box lacrosse league based in British Columbia, Canada, sanctioned by the British Columbia Lacrosse Association. The league champion and runner up both compete for the British Columbia Junior B2 Provincial Championship.

History 
Formed in 2001, the PNWJLL began as a five-team league. The inaugural season included Campbell River Ravens, Juan de Fuca Whalers, Nanaimo Jr. B Timbermen, Peninsula Falcons and Victoria-Esquimalt Eagles. The Timbermen were crowned the first league champion after an 11-3-1 season.

Expansion included one team for Season 2 as the league played with six teams for the 2002 and 2003 seasons. Membership peaked in 2004 when eight teams competed. That number did not last as three teams (Juan de Fuc Whalers, Peninsula Falcons and Saanich Tigers) folded after the season.

The Westshore Bears were the first PNWJLL team to win a gold medal at the British Columbia Provincials in 2005.

In August 2013 the Saanich Tigers captured the league's second Gold Medal at the British Columbia Provincials, defeating host Burnaby Lakers 12-10. Saanich defeated the Vernon Tigers 21-15 in the opening game before falling to Burnaby 10-9 on Day 2. A 7-6 win over the Delta Islanders earned their place in the championship.

Saanich repeated their Gold medal performance in 2015 winning all four games in the Provincials tournament held at The Q Centre in Victoria.

Teams

Former teams 
 Campbell River Ravens (2001-2012)
 Cowichan Valley Thunder (2002-2012; 2015-16; 2018)
 Juan de Fuca Whalers (2002-2004)
 Mid-Island Braves (2005)
 Nanaimo Jr. B Timbermen (2001-2004)
 Peninsula Falcons (2001-2006)
 Peninsula Warriors (2011-2013)
 Saanich Tigers (2004)
 Saanich Tigers (2011-2017)
 Saanich-Peninsula (2009-2010)
 Victoria-Esquimalt Eagles (2001-2012)

League champions

BC Provincials 
PNWJLL teams have had success competing in the British Columbia Junior B Provincials, earning medals on several occasions.

Medal history

See also
Thompson Okanagan Junior Lacrosse League
West Coast Junior Lacrosse League

References

External links
PNWJLL website
Nanaimo Jr. B Timbermen
Saanich Express
Westshore Bears
BCLA website

Sport in Vancouver
Lacrosse leagues in British Columbia